In military terms, 68th Division or 68th Infantry Division may refer to:

 68th Division (1st Formation)(People's Republic of China), 1949–1952
 68th Infantry Division (France)
 68th Infantry Division (Wehrmacht)
 68th Division (Imperial Japanese Army)